John L. Marks was an American football coach.  He served as the head football coach at the University of Notre Dame from 1911 to 1912, compiling a record of 13–0–2.  Marks played college football at Dartmouth College.

On October 5, 1912, in one of the easiest victories in Notre Dame history, junior quarterback Gus Dorais led the Irish to a 116–7 rout of St. Viator in the season-opener.

Head coaching record

References

Year of birth missing
Year of death missing
American football fullbacks
American football halfbacks
Dartmouth Big Green football players
Notre Dame Fighting Irish football coaches
St. Viator Irish football coaches